Serbia–Zimbabwe relations are bilateral ties between Serbia  and Zimbabwe. Yugoslavia (and now Serbia as one of its successor states) was a founding member of the Non-Aligned Movement, of which Zimbabwe is also a part.

Relations during Yugoslavia era

The conference center built in 1985 for the 1986 Non-Aligned Movement Summit in Zimbabwe was built by Serbian company Energoprojekt holding, as was Mugabe's personal home. Robert Mugabe met Yugoslav President Josip Broz Tito in Brijuni, Yugoslavia, and again in Havana, Cuba in 1979. When Tito died in 1980, Mugabe and a state delegation attended his funeral. Mugabe described Yugoslavia as the nation other non-aligned countries, especially African nations, went to for economic and technological needs.

Relations post Yugoslavia
In 2014, Zimbabwean President Robert Mugabe expressed his desire to rebuild and continue the friendship between Serbia and Zimbabwe, and described Serbia as the "only country in the world that [Zimbabwe] can consider a perfect friend," and that Serbia is Zimbabwe's only foreign ally. Mugabe also invited Serbian minister Ivan Mrkić to Zimbabwe to begin talks on joint projects in the fields of infrastructure, agriculture, information technology and mining.
Zimbabwe has an embassy in Belgrade, and Serbia has an embassy in Harare.

See also 
 Yugoslavia and the Non-Aligned Movement
 Yugoslavia and the Organisation of African Unity

References 

 

Serbia
Zimbabwe